Bolam is a village and former civil parish, now in the parish of Belsay in the county of Northumberland, England. In 1951 the civil parish had a population of 60. On 1 April 1955 it was merged into Belsay.

History
The Church of England parish church of St Andrew has a late Saxon west tower and is a Grade I listed building.

Bolam is the burial place of Robert de Reymes, a wealthy Suffolk merchant, who in 1296 began the building of Aydon Castle, near Corbridge.

Landmarks
Bolam Lake Country Park is next to the village.

Three archaeological sites are nearby: Huckhoe Settlement, an iron Age and Romano-British defended settlement; Slate Hill Settlement, an Iron Age defended settlement; and The Poind and his Man, a Neolithic site.

References

Further reading

External links

GENUKI (accessdate: 14 November 2008)

Villages in Northumberland
Former civil parishes in Northumberland
Belsay